Shenley Hall is a Grade II listed English country house at Shenley in Hertfordshire.

History
Built in the 19th century, the hall benefited from additions by Sir Edwin Lutyens in 1914 just before World War I. The hall featured in several episodes of The Avengers in the 1960s. Now owned by a transport software business, it is set in 16 acres of parkland and is Grade II listed.

References

Country houses in Hertfordshire
Grade II listed buildings in Hertfordshire
Works of Edwin Lutyens in England
Shenley